The 23rd Legislative Assembly of British Columbia sat from February 1953 to March 1953. The members were elected in the British Columbia general election held in June 1952. The Social Credit Party led by W. A. C. Bennett formed the government. The Co-operative Commonwealth Federation led by Harold Winch formed the official opposition.

Thomas James Irwin served as speaker for the assembly.

The government was defeated on Bill 79, known as the "Ralston formula", on March 24.

Members of the 23rd General Assembly 
The following members were elected to the assembly in 1952:

Notes:

Party standings

By-elections 
By-elections were held to replace members for various reasons:

Notes:

Other changes 
Lillooet (dec. Ernest Crawford Carson October 21, 1952)
Vancouver-Point Grey (dec. Albert Reginald MacDougall January 20, 1953)

References 

Political history of British Columbia
Terms of British Columbia Parliaments
1953 establishments in British Columbia
1953 disestablishments in British Columbia
20th century in British Columbia